Gamma II or Gamma 2 is a residential locality in western Greater Noida, Uttar Pradesh, India. Bordered by Gamma I to the west, Delta III to the east and Beta I to the south, it is considered one of the affluent neighborhoods in the city. The neighborhood once served the registry office of Greater Noida Industrial Development Authority.

Landmarks 

 Delhi Public School, Greater Noida

References 

Gautam Buddh Nagar district